USS Shellbark (AN-67/YN-91) was a  which was assigned to protect U.S. Navy ships and harbors during World War II with her anti-submarine nets.

Constructed in Slidell, Louisiana 
Shellbark (AN-67) was laid down on 15 September 1943 by the Canulette Shipbuilding Co. Inc., Slidell, Louisiana, as YN-91; launched on 31 October 1943; redesignated as AN-67 on 20 January 1944; and commissioned on 12 April.

World War II service 
Shellbark sailed to Newport, Rhode Island, on the 30th to begin her shakedown cruise. Upon completion, she was in the Boston Navy Yard from 24 to 31 May.

She reported to the 1st Naval District for duty on 1 June. Shellbark was then assigned to the U.S. Atlantic Fleet for temporary duty with the U.S. 12th Fleet. The net layer arrived in Belfast, Northern Ireland, on 20 July and operated in English waters until she departed Plymouth, England, on 6 November.
 
Shellbark returned to Norfolk, Virginia, on 21 November 1944 and operated from there until departing on 20 February 1945 for San Francisco, California, via the Panama Canal Zone and San Diego, California. She stood out of San Francisco on 27 April en route to Pearl Harbor, arriving there on 7 May. She sailed from there 20 days later for Eniwetok, Guam, Saipan, and Okinawa.
 
Shellbark operated in the Okinawa area from 13 July to 20 September. On the 22d, she moved into Japanese home waters around Honshū, operating from Kobe and Wakayama, until 1 February 1946. On that date, she sailed for Shanghai. She arrived on 17 March and began preparations for decommissioning.

Post-war inactivation
Shellbark was decommissioned on 19 April and sold to China the next day. She was struck from the Navy List on 1 May 1946.

References 
 
 NavSource Online: Service Ship Photo Archive - YN-91 / AN-67 Shellbark

 

Ailanthus-class net laying ships of the United States Navy
Ships built in Slidell, Louisiana
1943 ships
World War II net laying ships of the United States